Buchan is a surname. Notable people with the surname include:

Alastair Buchan (born 1955), British neurologist and researcher in stroke medicine
Alexander Buchan (disambiguation)
Alfred L. Buchan (1847-1905), American physician and politician
Andrew Buchan (born 1979), English stage and television actor
Angus Buchan (born 1947), Scottish-Zambian farmer, now an evangelist and writer in South Africa
Bryan Buchan (born 1945), Scottish-born Canadian author
Charlie Buchan (1891–1960), English football player and writer
Colin Buchan, Scottish footballer
David Buchan (1780–1838), Scottish naval officer and Arctic explorer
Elizabeth Buchan (born 1948), British writer
Elspeth Buchan (1738–1791), founder of a Scottish religious sect
George Buchan of Kelloe (29 May 1775 - 3 January 1856), high ranking civil servant, author and church leader
James Buchan (footballer) (1881–unknown), Scottish football player
James Buchan (born 1954), Scottish novelist and journalist
Janey Buchan (1926–2012), Scottish politician
John Buchan, 1st Baron Tweedsmuir (1875–1940), Scottish novelist, politician, Governor General of Canada
John Buchan, 2nd Baron Tweedsmuir (1911–1996),  Scottish colonial administrator and soldier
Martin Buchan (born 1949), Scottish former footballer
Norman Buchan (1922–1990), Scottish politician
Perdita Buchan (born 1940), Anglo-American author
Peter Buchan (1790–1854), Scottish editor, publisher and collector of ballads and folktales
Ray Buchan (1908–1986), New Zealand cricketer
Susan Buchan, Baroness Tweedsmuir (1882–1977) British author of novels, children's books and biographies
Tom Buchan (1889–1952), English football player
Wattie Buchan (born 1956), Scottish punk rock musician
William Buchan (disambiguation)

Celtic-language surnames